Rae Ann Gummer Kelsch (November 16, 1959 – October 30, 2018) was an American politician.

Biography
Kelsch was born in Mayville, North Dakota. She received her bachelor's degree in business administration from the University of North Dakota. She contested her first state election legislative election in 1990, serving on the North Dakota House of Representatives starting in 1991 until losing reelection in 2012, when it was reported that she had not filed state income tax returns for seven years. Kelsch's husband Thomas said he was responsible for the couple's tax problems and the tax bill was eventually paid. After leaving the state legislature, Kelsch worked for the National Federation of Independent Business.

Kelsch died, aged 58, in New Orleans of a bacterial infection on October 30, 2018, after consuming raw oysters.

References

1959 births
2018 deaths
People from Mandan, North Dakota
People from Traill County, North Dakota
Businesspeople from North Dakota
Republican Party members of the North Dakota House of Representatives
Women state legislators in North Dakota
University of North Dakota alumni
20th-century American businesspeople
20th-century American women
21st-century American women